This is a list of beaches and bathing areas in Ireland.

Ulster 

 County Antrim
 Ballycastle Beach
 Portrush (West Strand and Whiterocks Strand)
 White Park Bay

 County Donegal
 Ballyhiernan, Fanad
 Carrickfinn
 Culdaff
 Drumnatinny
 Fintra
 Five Fingers Strand
 Killahoey Strand, Dunfanaghy
 Kinnagoe Bay
 Lady's Bay, Buncrana
 Lisfannon Strand
 Magheraclogher Strand
 Marble Hill
 Murder Hole Beach
 Murvagh
 Narin
 Pollan Strand, Doagh Island
 Port Arthur, Derrybeg
 Portnablagh
 Portsalon (officially Stocker Strand and Warden Strand)
 Rathmullan Strand
 Rosapenna Strand, also known as Tramore Strand, Rosguill
 Rossnowlagh Strand, also known as Belall Strand
 Shrove Strand
 Tullan Strand, Bundoran

 County Down
 Ballyholme Strand
 Cranfield Beach
 Helen's Bay
 Newcastle Strand
 Tyrella Strand

 County Londonderry
 Benone Strand
 Castlerock Strand
 Magilligan Strand
 Portstewart Strand

Munster 

 County Clare
 Ballyallia Lake, Ennis
 Ballycuggeran
 Bishopsquarter
 Cappagh Pier, Kilrush
 Fanore
 Kilkee
 Lahinch
 Mountshannon, Lough Derg
 Spanish Point
 White Strand, Doonbeg
 White Strand, Miltown Malbay

 County Cork
 Barley Cove
 Coolmaine
 Fountainstown
 Garretstown
 Garrylucas, White Strand
 Garryvoe
 Inchydoney
 Owenahincha, Little Island Strand
 Redbarn
 Tragumna
 Warren, Cregane Strand
 Youghal, Claycastle
 Youghal, Front strand beach

 County Kerry
 Ballinskelligs
 Ballybunion North
 Ballybunion South
 Ballyheigue
 Banna Strand
 Castlegregory
 Derrynane
 Fenit
 Inch
 Inny strand, Waterville
 Kells
 Maharabeg
 Rossbeigh, White Strand
 Ventry
 White Strand, Caherciveen

 County Waterford
 Ardmore Beach
 Bunmahon Beach
 Clonea Beach
 Counsellor's Strand, Dunmore East
 Dunmore Strand, Dunmore East
 Tramore Strand

Connacht 

 County Galway
 An Trá Mór, Coill Rua, Inverin
 Ballyloughane Beach
 Bathing Place at Portumna
 Céibh an Spidéil
 Cill Mhuirbhigh, Inis Mór
 Clifden Beach
 Goirtín, Cloch Na Rón
 Grattan Road Beach
 Loughrea Lake
 Salthill Beach
 Silverstrand Beach
 Trá an Dóilín, Carraroe
 Trá Chaladh Fínis, Carna
 Trá na bhForbacha, Furbo
 Trá na mBan, Spiddal
 Traught, Kinvara

 County Leitrim
 Keeldra Lough

 County Mayo
 Achill Island: Dooega Beach
 Achill Island: Dugort Beach
 Achill Island: Golden Strand
 Achill Island: Keel Beach
 Achill Island: Keem Beach
 Belmullet: Elly Bay
 Belmullet: Mullaghroe Beach
 Bertra Beach, Murrisk
 Louisburgh: Carrowmore Beach
 Louisburgh: Carrowniskey
 Louisburgh: Clare Island
 Louisburgh: Old Head Beach
 Louisburgh: Silver Strand
 Louisburgh: Uggool Beach
 Mulranny Beach
 Rinroe Beach, Corrowigue
 Ross Beach, Killala

 County Sligo
 Dunmoran Beach
 Enniscrone Beach
 Mullaghmore Beach
 Rosses Point Beach
 Streedagh Beach

Leinster 

 County Dublin
 Balbriggan (Front Strand Beach)
 Claremont Beach
 Dollymount Strand
 Donabate (Balcarrick Beach)
 Killiney
 Loughshinny Beach
 Malahide Beach
 Merrion Strand
 Portmarnock (Velvet Strand Beach)
 Portrane (the Brook Beach)
 Rush (South Beach)
 Sandymount Strand
 Seapoint
 Skerries (South Beach)
 Sutton (Burrow Beach)

 County Louth
 Clogherhead Beach
 Port (Lurganboy)
 Seapoint
 Shelling Hill Beach, also known as Templetown Beach

 County Meath
 Laytown / Bettystown

 County Westmeath
 Lilliput, Lough Ennel
 Portnashangan, Lough Owel
 The Cut, Lough Lene

 County Wexford
 Ballymoney, North Beach
 Courtown, North Beach
 Curracloe
 Duncannon
 Morriscastle
 Rosslare Strand

 County Wicklow
 Bray South Promenade
 Brittas Bay North
 Brittas Bay South
 Clogga
 Martin Kellys private beach
 Greystones South
 Silver Strand

See also
 List of beaches

 Coastal landforms of Ireland

Resources
 Beaches.ie, an Irish beach quality website (originally known as "Splash" at bathingwater.ie) launched in 2009 by the Environmental Protection Agency.

References

Beaches
Ireland
Atlantic Ocean-related lists
Beaches